Carlos Gabín (25 November 1906 – 1956) was an Uruguayan basketball player. He competed in the 1936 Summer Olympics.

References

External links

1906 births
1956 deaths
Uruguayan men's basketball players
Olympic basketball players of Uruguay
Basketball players at the 1936 Summer Olympics
Place of birth missing
Date of death missing
Place of death missing